Cotylurus is a genus of trematodes belonging to the family Strigeidae.

The species of this genus are found in Europe, Northern America and Australia.

Species:

Cotylurus aquavis 
Cotylurus brevis 
Cotylurus cornutus 
Cotylurus flabelliformis 
Cotylurus gallinulae 
Cotylurus hebraicus 
Cotylurus marcogliesei
Cotylurus raabei 
Cotylurus strigeoides 
Cotylurus syrius 
Cotylurus szidati

References

Platyhelminthes